Parcham-e Qadim (also Romanized as Parcham-e Qadīm; also known as Narcham, Parcham, Pīr Cham, and Purcham) is a village in Gilvan Rural District, in the Central District of Tarom County, Zanjan Province, Iran. At the 2006 census, its population was 152, in 31 families.

References 

Populated places in Tarom County